Test Pattern was the first game show on the Canadian television channel MuchMusic in the late from 1989 into the early 1990s. The music and sound man was Bill St. Amour. The show's announcer was Bill Carroll (Except for one week when Briane Nasimok who was the producer and played recurring characters, took his place). It occasionally featured Canadian musicians who were prominent at the time. Dan Gallagher hosted the program and it was produced and directed by Sidney M. Cohen. The show was cancelled after two seasons. Reruns currently air Mondays and Fridays on GameTV. Reruns of episodes from the show's second season also aired during the summer of 2003 on MuchMoreMusic. The entire first season is currently available on the subscription service Bonusround.ca. 

The show was a points-based contest, with the highest scorer winning a grand prize. There were four five-time champions in the first season. These four contestants were deemed the best contestants that season, and won trips to Las Vegas, Mexico, Jamaica, and Florida. All four participated in a "Tournament of Champions" show in season two, for which the grand prize was a home stereo.

Gameplay
The main game featured a "video wall" with a grid of nine windows with television screen facades. Each window concealed a category or other game feature. In each of the two main rounds, contestants would take turns throwing a fake brick at the game board; for most screens, this would reveal a category from which trivia questions would be asked to all three contestants by ring-in format. (Occasionally if a contestant kept missing the board, Dan would ask them which window they were aiming for and would hit it himself.) Each correct answer added points, while each incorrect answer deducted them. Questions in the first main round were worth 10 points, and in the second main round were worth 20 points. The board also concealed mini-games, which that contestant would play, and a "switch" space: This space knocked the player out of the game and switched them with another contestant waiting to play.

The most frequent categories are:
S*x (inappropriate for children) (originally appeared as a space on the wheel with up to three questions asked for up to 40 points in a double or nothing format)
Things LOSERS/AMERICANS don't know
Cold Cash - The contestant is directed to the fridge and picks "Cold", "Colder", or "Coldest" envelope, each revealing a different number of old two-dollar bills. It doesn't mean that "Coldest" has the most two-dollar bills and hence, the help from the entire audience.
Switch - The contestant in the deck switches with the contestant who revealed the category. However, the contestant who revealed "switch" will get all the profit when the new contestant wins.

The show also had a round featuring a large floor-based game wheel with eight mini-games. An audience member was selected to lie on the wheel and act as the indicator, and the wheel with the audience member was spun once by each contestant who would play the game that resulted.

The show had at least two slightly different formats: In one format, the two main rounds were the first two rounds of the game with the board in the second round remaining as it was following the first round; this was followed by the wheel round. In the second format, the first round was following by the wheel round; the board was reset for the subsequent second main round, including the switch space which was once again available. It is unknown which of these formats preceded which.

The fourth and final round of each game was a lightning round, in which the contestants donned motorcycle-style helmets outfitted with a lightbulb and a button on the forehead. Contestants had to slap the button to ring in. As many questions as possible were asked in the 58-second time limit. The player with the highest score at the end of the round won the grand prize and returned on the next episode. If there was a tie between two players, a tie-breaker question was asked.

Mini-games
 
Among the mini-games played were:
 Pablo's Hands - The contestant would be blindfolded and have to identify a slimy substance on Pablo's hands by smell, touch and/or taste.
The Hairy Back Brothers - A pair of large hirsute men would take off their shirts, revealing extremely hairy backs with several band-aids on them. The contestant had to remove a band-aid and reveal a reward or penalty.

The labels on the game wheel, which resulted in random questions or challenges, were:

Test Drive
The Steve Show – contestants who were named Steve
Dan's Choice - The host (Dan) gets to choose any mini-game on the wheel
Spinner Winner - The audience member in the wheel wins "The Official Test Pattern 2-Slice Toaster"
Going Going - The Contestant will choose an X Y or Z envelope. Dan will ask a question. A correct answer keeps them in the game. A wrong answer means the contestant will have to switch with the on deck contestant. (when a contestant chooses "Y" this is usually followed by Dan saying "He/she is choosing Y" followed by the audience saying in unison "because we love you.")
Gone (First five shows only) - The contestant is immediately kicked off the show and a new contestant is brought in to take their place.  It was only hit once during it's short lifespan.
Guts - The contestant is directed to a diagram of the human anatomy. On the diagram are 3 envelopes, each labeled with a different category (usually "Sex", "Music", and "Cheese").
Free Lunch
Dance Break - Contestants must perform an aerobic dance and the best dancer (determined by the crowd applause) wins points
Top 40 - The host (Dan) is handed a record with a question on it. Dan asks the contestant the question and if they get it correct, they win points and the record. If the contestant answers incorrectly, they still get the record. (originally featured behind one of the spaces on the video wall with the same rules)
Mystery Potato Head - The contestant smashes one of 5 potatoes with a hammer to reveal a prize or point value hidden inside.
Goofs, Goofs, Goofs
Paper Boy
Human Pinata - A staffer wears a ski-doo helmet, a neck brace, and safety goggles then climbs to the top of a ladder. They hang a brown paper bag from their neck and wait for the host (Dan) to ask the blindfolded contestant a question. If the contestant answers correct, they are given a cardboard tube to swing at the "pinata", where they can win the treats inside the bag.
Bowl & Win - The contestant is directed to a six-pin bowling alley and gets blindfolded. If the contestant gets a strike, the contestant wins 30 points.
Hide The Salami - The contestant is directed to a fridge on-set and has to guess in which compartment in the fridge is a salami on which are points the contestant either added or deducted from his score.

Prizes
One of the most famous prizes on the show was winning a 2-slice toaster, considered by some to be the most sought-after prize on Test Pattern.

See also
 Remote Control (game show)—MTV game show similar to Test Pattern

1980s Canadian game shows
1990s Canadian game shows
Much (TV channel) original programming
1989 Canadian television series debuts
1991 Canadian television series endings
Television shows filmed in Toronto
Television game shows with incorrect disambiguation